Abbasabad-e Qarah Aghaj (also Romanized as ‘Abbāsābād-e Qarah Āghāj; also known as ‘Abbāsābād) is a village in Hakimabad Rural District, in the Central District of Zarandieh County, Markazi Province, Iran. At the 2006 census, its population was 17, in 4 families.

References 

Populated places in Zarandieh County